Maya is a 1961 Bollywood film directed by D.D. Kashyap.
The film stars Dev Anand and Mala Sinha along with Lalita Pawar in the main lead. This film Maya was made just a year before Asli-Naqli, but with a very similar story line. It was less successful in the box office compared to Asli-Naqli. But with the music of the film, composed by Maestro Salil Chowdhury and the songs penned by Majrooh Sultanpuri, the film was a big hit and was much liked.

Synopsis and characters 
A wealthy young man, Manmohan (Dev Anand) strikes to his own to see how the rest of the world lives. He pretends to be poor, goes to live in a community of poor people, and falls in love with a poor girl, Shyama (Mala Sinha), who doesn't realise he's a wealthy man.

Maya gets off to a running start: we see a liveried servant Garibu (Sunder) hosting a dinner party for a bunch of other similarly clad servants. This is in the absence of all their masters. The 'host' of this party is servant to Seth, Ram Narain (Mubarak). Seth Ram Narain isn't in town right now, and his only son, Manmohan (Dev Anand) is out celebrating his birthday with a party with his friends.

Manmohan returns unexpectedly, depressed and in melancholy from that party. Now the movie shows a flashback of the party, where Manmohan—within the course of a few brief minutes—gets several bad jolts. First, he sees (standing outside the party hall) his old friend Deepak (Krishan Dhawan), who's come to wish well to Manmohan for his birthday. Despite much cajoling on Manmohan's part, Deepak refuses to come inside—he insists that he, in his simple clothes, will be out of place amidst all those suits and glittery saris. Manmohan, who seems to genuinely like his friend, accepts that, and then apologises for not having kept in touch with Deepak. "I remember you'd told me that your wife was ill, and you needed money for her treatment", Manmohan tells Deepak. "But I went away to Kashmir with some friends, and forgot all about that. I hope bhabhi's better now." Then comes the first shock: Deepak's wife died as a result of that illness. Still shaken, Manmohan eventually goes back into the party hall, and here he receives two more shocks. First, he hears a 'friend' telling others that he's made friends with Manmohan in order to get a business deal through. Then Manmohan overhears his girlfriend Shiela (Bela Bose) telling another man that she only fawns on Manmohan because of his wealth; she doesn't really love him.

A disillusioned and depressed Manmohan comes home and goes to bed. He's tossing and turning when an unexpected visitor enters his room: a thief. Manmohan manages to overpower the man Sudesh (Sudesh Kumar) pretty effortlessly: even though the thief has a dagger, he can't bring himself to use it. When Manmohan confronts him, he breaks down and confesses all. His name is Sudesh, and though he's a member of a gang of petty criminals, his heart's not in this work at all. He's ashamed of it, too, and begs Manmohan not to hand him over to the police. It'll break the heart of Sudesh's sister Shyama (Mala Sinha), who dotes on her brother. He tells Sudesh that he will keep mum and not hand Sudesh over to the cops—if Sudesh will help him in return. And how? By giving Manmohan a taste of poverty. Manmohan will accompany Sudesh to the chawl where Sudesh lives, and Manmohan will find a place to stay there too. He'll earn his daily bread, somehow make ends meet, do without, face hardship and live as a poor man. Sudesh agrees and after Manmohan has changed into more commonplace clothing, the two men go off to the chawl where Sudesh lives. Sudesh's Mausi (Lalita Pawar) is a kind and motherly lady from whom Manmohan—now calling himself Shyam—rents a room. This storyline moves forward with many other characters.

This movie features one person who went on to become one of Hindi cinema's greatest onscreen villains, Amjad Khan. In one scene, this boy is sharing screen space with his real life father, Jayant. Amjad Khan was actually about 20 when the film was released. There is Banke (Agha), who is a member of the same gang as Sudesh. Banke, while he's pretty street-smart and not above throwing his weight around, is also a good man at heart. He's in love with a pretty lady Madam (Helen). Madam also lives in the chawl, and is derisive of Banke and his repeated declarations of his love. One more character is ruthless Ranvir (Jayant), who is Banke (Agha) and Sudesh's boss and heads a gang of thieves, extortionists, and worse. Also, he has an eye on Shyama for himself. When he finds that Shyama and Shyam are in love with each other he doesn't like it and gets furious.

And there is Sudesh's elder sister, Shyama (Mala Sinha). On the first night when Sudesh brings Manmohan/Shyam home, Shyama is out. Sudesh lets Shyam sleep in his own bed, and since Shyam—covered up with a sheet completely from head to toe—is lying in her brother's bed, Shyama, on arriving the next morning, thinks this is her brother. When, despite much tugging and scolding, he refuses to wake up, Shyama pours a bucketful of water over him—only to find that this is a stranger, not Sudesh. Shyama and Shyam are soon in love. Shyam finds himself a job—selling ice cream from a cart—and all is happiness, love and contentment. But there are problems lurking in the background. Shyam, after all, is really Manmohan. He's left a big mansion behind, and the owner of that big mansion, Manmohan's wealthy father, will soon be back and will wonder where his son has disappeared to. if and when he discovers Manmohan's new and humble avatar, he's not going to be very pleased. Also, Shyama's reaction, when she discovers that the man she loves has been lying to her all along about his identity. All these the factors makes this movie a complete feature.

Cast
 Dev Anand – Manmohan / Shyam
 Mala Sinha – Shyama
 Mubarak – Seth Shyam Narain
 Lalita Pawar – Mausi
 Sudesh Kumar – Sudesh
 Agha – Banke
 Sunder – Garibu
 Helen – Banke's darling
 Krishan Dhawan – Deepak
 Niranjan Sharma – Chawl Dweller, Tara's father
 Jayant – Ranvir
 Amjad Khan – a teenager, Ranvir's employee
 Bela Bose - Sheela
 Tabassum - chawl girl eating ice cream
 Nana Palshikar - Panditji
 Brahm Bharadwaj - dance announcer
 Rani Nrityashromani - dancer performing in chawl
 Tina Misquitta - dancer in Ranvir's den

Soundtrack

References

External links 
 

1960s Hindi-language films
1961 films
Films scored by Salil Chowdhury